The St. Cloud Metropolitan Statistical Area, as defined by the United States Census Bureau, is an area consisting of two counties in central Minnesota, anchored by the city of St. Cloud. In the 2010 census, the MSA had a population of 201,093; a July 1, 2012, estimate by the Census Bureau placed the population at 190,014. As of the 2020 census, the population was 199,671.

The St. Cloud Metropolitan Statistical Area is part of the Minneapolis-Saint Paul, MN-WI Combined Statistical Area.

Counties
Benton
Stearns

Communities

Principal City
St. Cloud (68,881)* (partial)

Places with 5,000 to 20,000 inhabitants
Sartell (19,531)
Sauk Rapids (13,862)
Waite Park (8,341)
St. Joseph (7,029)

Places with 1,000 to 5,000 inhabitants
Sauk Centre (4,555)
Cold Spring (4,164)
Melrose (3,602)
St. Augusta (3,467)
Albany (2,780)
Foley (2,711)
Paynesville (2,388)
Rice (1,633)
Avon (1,618)
Richmond (1,475)
Royalton (partial) (1,281)

Places with 500 to 1,000 inhabitants
Belgrade
Brooten (partial)
Clearwater (partial)
Eden Valley (partial)
Holdingford
Kimball
Rockville
St. Stephen

Places with less than 500 inhabitants
Elrosa
Freeport
Gilman
Greenwald
Lake Henry
Meire Grove
New Munich
Ronneby
Roscoe
Spring Hill
St. Anthony
St. Martin
St. Rosa

Unincorporated places

Townships

Benton County

Stearns County

Demographics

At the 2000 census, there were 167,392 people, 60,669 households and 40,650 families residing within the MSA. The racial makeup of the MSA was 96.04% White, 0.82% African American, 0.31% Native American, 1.49% Asian, 0.04% Pacific Islander, 0.45% from other races, and 0.84% from two or more races. Hispanic or Latino of any race were 1.27% of the population.

The median household income was $42,197 and the median family income was $51,415. Males had a median income of $33,741 compared with $23,065 for females. The per capita income was $19,110.

See also
Minnesota census statistical areas

References

 
Geography of Stearns County, Minnesota
Geography of Benton County, Minnesota